Astrocasia is a plant genus of the family Phyllanthaceae first described as a genus in 1905.  It is included in the subtribe Astrocasiinae. It is native to Mesoamerica, northern South America, and the western part of the West Indies. Plants are mostly dioecious, except for Astrocasia diegoae which is monoecious, and some individuals of A. neurocarpa and A. tremula.

Species
 Astrocasia austinii  (Standl.) G.L.Webster - Izabal
 Astrocasia diegoae J.Jiménez Ram. & Mart.Gord. - Guerrero
 Astrocasia jacobinensis (Müll.Arg.) G.L.Webster - Bahia, Bolivia
 Astrocasia neurocarpa (Müll.Arg.) I.M.Johnst. ex Standl. - Oaxaca, Querétaro, San Luis Potosí, Tamaulipas
 Astrocasia peltata Standl. - Costa Rica, Nayarit, Jalisco
 Astrocasia tremula (Griseb.) G.L.Webster - Mexico (Jalisco, Veracruz, Yucatán Peninsula), Central America (Belize, Guatemala, Costa Rica, Panama), West Indies (Cayman Is, Jamaica, Cuba), northern South America (Colombia, Venezuela, possibly Brazil)

References

Phyllanthaceae
Phyllanthaceae genera